In mathematics, S-function may refer to:
sigmoid function
Schur polynomials
Slesarenko function(smooth function, S-function)
A function in the Laplace transformed 's-domain'
In physics, it may refer to:
action functional
In MATLAB, it may refer to: 
A type of dynamically linked subroutine for Simulink.